Ergänzungs-Jagdgruppe West (EJGr West) (Supplementary Fighter Group, West) was a fighter pilot training unit of the German Luftwaffe in World War II. It was formed on 6 February 1942 in Cazaux and renamed ''Jagdgruppe West'' (JGr West) on 30 November 1942.

Commanding officers

Gruppenkommandeure
Major Jürgen Roth, 6 February 1942 – 4 January 1943
Major Georg Michalek, 5 January 1943 – 3 January 1944
Hauptmann Herbert Wehnelt, 4 January 1944 – 4 November 1944

References
Notes

References
 Jagdgruppe West @ The Luftwaffe, 1933-45

Luftwaffe Wings
Military units and formations established in 1942
Military units and formations disestablished in 1944